The hydrogen anion, H−, is a negative ion of hydrogen, that is, a hydrogen atom that has captured an extra electron. The hydrogen anion is an important constituent of the atmosphere of stars, such as the Sun.  In chemistry, this ion is called hydride. The ion has two electrons bound by the electromagnetic force to a nucleus containing one proton.

The binding energy of H− equals the binding energy of an extra electron to a hydrogen atom, called electron affinity of hydrogen. The total ground state energy thus becomes .

Occurrence
The hydrogen anion is the dominant bound-free opacity source at visible and near-infrared wavelengths in the atmospheres of stars like the Sun and cooler; its importance was first noted in the 1930s. The ion absorbs photons with energies in the range 0.75–4.0 eV, which ranges from the infrared into the visible spectrum.  Most of the electrons in these negative ions come from the ionization of metals with low first ionization potentials, including the alkali metals and alkali earths.  The process which ejects the electron from the ion is properly called photodetachment rather than photoionization because the result is a neutral atom (rather than an ion) and a free electron.

H− also occurs in the Earth's ionosphere and can be produced in particle accelerators. 

Its existence was first proven theoretically by Hans Bethe in 1929. H− is unusual because, in its free form, it has no bound excited states, as was finally proven in 1977.

In chemistry, the hydride anion is hydrogen that has the formal oxidation state −1.

The term hydride is probably most often used to describe compounds of hydrogen with other elements in which the hydrogen is in the formal −1 oxidation state.  In most such compounds the bonding between the hydrogen and its nearest neighbor is covalent. An example of a hydride is the borohydride anion.

See also
 Hydron (hydrogen cation)
 Electride, another very simple anion
 Hydrogen ion

References 

Hydrogen physics
Astrophysics
Anions